Our Lady Queen of Martyrs Church, located at 81 Arden Street at Dongan Place, between Broadway and Sherman Avenue in the Inwood neighborhood of Manhattan, New York City, is a Roman Catholic parish church in the Roman Catholic Archdiocese of New York.  The parish was established in 1927 and a church was built in 1928 to designs by Gustave E. Steinback.

School
A temporary school was begun in the church's rectory building in 1932, and plans were made for a permanent school building, but it was not built at the time because of the Great Depression. In 1934, however, an auditorium and temporary classrooms were built. A four-story school, also designed by Gustave E. Steinback, was built in 1949–50.

Franciscan Missionary Sisters of the Sacred Heart originally staffed the school from 1932 until 1980. Since then, it has been staffed by lay teachers.

References 
Notes

External links

Roman Catholic churches completed in 1928
School buildings completed in 1949
Christian organizations established in 1927
Our Lady Queen Of Martyrs Church
Gustave E. Steinback church buildings
Our Lady Queen Of Martyrs Church
20th-century Roman Catholic church buildings in the United States